Dystrobrevin beta is a protein which in humans is encoded by the DTNB gene.

Function 

This gene encodes dystrobrevin beta, a component of the dystrophin-associated protein complex (DPC). The DPC consists of dystrophin and several integral and peripheral membrane proteins, including dystroglycans, sarcoglycans, syntrophins and dystrobrevin alpha and beta. The DPC localizes to the sarcolemma and its disruption is associated with various forms of muscular dystrophy. Dystrobrevin beta is thought to interact with syntrophin and the DP71 short form of dystrophin. Alternatively spliced transcript variants encoding different isoforms have been identified.

References

Further reading

Genes
Histology